The Samuel Finely Breese Morse Medal was established in 1902. Designed by Laura G. Fraser, this medal is awarded by the American Geographical Society for "achievements and pioneering in geographical research."

History
Samuel Finley Breese Morse was a painter, but also a noted inventor. After extensive travel in Europe, Morse invented the first recording telegraph, which he submitted at patent for in 1837. His system of dots and dashes, equip with a dictionary and words, later was known as Morse Code. After his death on April 2, 1872, the Society was willed funds “for the encouragement of geographical research.”

Recipients
The following people received the award in the year specified:

See also

 List of geography awards

References

Further reading

External links
 Official website

Awards of the American Geographical Society
Awards established in 1902
1902 establishments in the United States